The Cavan Intermediate Football Championship is an annual Gaelic Athletic Association competition between the middle-tier Gaelic football clubs organised by Cavan GAA. It was first competed for in 1915, before a lapse prior to being revived in 1966. The winners qualify to represent their county in the Ulster Intermediate Club Football Championship and in turn, go on to the All-Ireland Intermediate Club Football Championship. The 2022 champions are Castlerahan who beat Ballyhaise in the final.

Format
14 teams will contest the Hotel Kilmore Intermediate Football Championship.

The I.F.C. shall be run on a league basis up to the Quarter-Final stage and Knock-out thereafter. Each team will play 4 rounds in the league phase against different opponents with the fixtures decided by a random draw at the conclusion of each round. Placings in the league stage shall be decided in accordance with rule 6.21 of the GAA Official Guide 2016 as amended below:

6.21 (4) If a Championship is partly organised on a League basis, the following Regulations shall apply: (a) League Results shall be credited as follows: 2 points for a win, and one for a draw. (b) If a Team is Disqualified or Retires during the course of a League Stage, its played games shall stand and its un-played games shall be awarded to the opposing teams. (c) As provided for in this Competition Regulation, when teams finish with equal points for Qualification for the Concluding Stages, or for Promotion or Relegation, the tie shall be decided by the following means and in the order specified: (i) Play-Off.

The top 8 teams in the league progress to the Quarter-Finals while the bottom 4 placed teams in the league enter a Relegation Playoff with 1 team to be relegated to the Cavan Junior Football Championship. The winner is promoted to the Cavan Senior Football Championship

Qualification for subsequent competitions

Ulster Intermediate Club Football Championship
The Cavan IFC winner qualifies for the Ulster Intermediate Club Football Championship. It is the only team from County Armagh to qualify for this competition. The Cavan IFC winner may enter the Ulster Intermediate Club Football Championship at either the preliminary round or the quarter-final stage.

All-Ireland Intermediate Club Football Championship
The Cavan IFC winners — by winning the Ulster Intermediate Club Football Championship — may qualify for the All-Ireland Intermediate Club Football Championship, at which it would enter at the semi-final stage, providing it hasn't been drawn to face the British champions in the quarter-finals.

Top winners

Roll of honour

References

External links
Cavan at ClubGAA
Official Cavan GAA Website

Cavan GAA Football championships
Intermediate Gaelic football county championships